Khuthazani Kingdom Mchunu (born 1 July 1997) is a South African rugby union player for the  in Super Rugby and in the Currie Cup and the  in the Rugby Challenge. His regular position is prop.

References

External links
 

South African rugby union players
Living people
1997 births
Zulu people
People from Greytown, KwaZulu-Natal
Rugby union props
Sharks (Currie Cup) players
Sharks (rugby union) players
Cheetahs (rugby union) players
Free State Cheetahs players
Rugby union players from KwaZulu-Natal